The Luele River (called the Pio-Pio or Lié River in its lower course) runs from south to north through  Idiofa territory, Kwilu province, Democratic Republic of the Congo.
The river starts as a clear stream in a small valley near Idiofa. It grows in size rapidly due to many small tributaries, among which is the Punkulu River, and then meanders through a large valley before entering the Kasai River downstream from Mangai.

References

Rivers of the Democratic Republic of the Congo
Kwilu Province
Kasai River